The men's 100 metre backstroke competition of the swimming events at the 1999 Pan American Games took place on 6 August at the Pan Am Pool. The last Pan American Games champion was Jeff Rouse of US.

This race consisted of two lengths of the pool, all in backstroke.

It was the first time a non-American won this event at the Pan American Games.

Results
All times are in minutes and seconds.

Heats
The first round was held on August 6.

B Final 
The B final was held on August 6.

A Final 
The A final was held on August 6.

References

Swimming at the 1999 Pan American Games